Kelapa Dua is a district located in the Tangerang Regency of Banten in Java, Indonesia. It covers an area of 24.38 km2 and had a population of 178,035 at the 2010 Census and 169,340 at the 2020 Census.

References

Tangerang Regency
Districts of Banten
Populated places in Banten